Park Se-jun, also referred to as Sejun Park, is a South Korean Pokémon video gamer and Pokémon Trading Card Game player. He is best known for winning the Masters Division of the Video Game Championships (VGC) at the 2014 Pokémon World Championships.

In November 2019, Park was picked up by esports team T1 as a player for the Pokémon Video Game, Pokémon Trading Card Game and Super Smash Bros. Ultimate. He announced on Twitter that he left the team in March 2022.

Pokémon career
Park is highly regarded as one of the best players in the world and has consistently made Top 8 finishes as a video game player at the Pokémon World Championships. He made his debut on the international stage in 2011 by finishing 2nd in the Senior Division of the 2011 Pokémon World Championships, and as a fresh Masters Division player in 2012, finished 5th at the 2012 Pokémon World Championships after losing to Wolfe Glick (2012, 2nd place) in the quarterfinals.

In 2013, Park repeated history and placed 5th again at the 2013 Pokémon World Championships in Vancouver, losing to Ryosuke Kosuge (2013, 2nd place) in the quarterfinals.

In the following year, Park won the 2014 South Korea Video Game National Championships. He then proceeded to win the 2014 Pokémon World Championships in Washington, D.C., defeating Jeudy Azzarelli in the Masters Division finals. Park was notable for being the first South Korean to win the Pokémon World Championships and to win with a Pachirisu in his team, which was much adored by fans. In honor of his achievements, Pokémon Korea hosted a celebratory event known as 'Champion's Day' in November 2014.

In 2016, Park earned an invitation to the 2016 Pokémon World Championships as a Trading Card Game player.

In December 2019, Park won the Pokémon World Champion Invitational 2020, a grassroots tournament for Pokémon Sword and Shield in which all video game World Champions from past years were invited to. He executed a flawless run during the tournament, defeating Ray Rizzo (2010, 2011, 2012), Paul Ruiz (2018) and Naoto Mizobuchi (2019) in pools, and then Wolfe Glick (2016) and Shoma Honami (2015) in the semifinals and finals respectively.

He played in the 2022 Pokémon World Championships with Team Eternity, a South Korean Pokémon Unite team. Team Eternity finished the tournament in eighth place.

Super Smash Bros. Ultimate 
Park is currently ranked 6 in the season 3 Korean Power Ranking and main character is King Dedede.

In April 2021, Park competed in the Smash World Tour 2021 and qualified in the East Asia Online Qualifier.

References

External links
  
 Sejun's Twitter

South Korean esports players
Pokémon video game players
1996 births
Place of birth missing (living people)
Living people